The Soul of Nigger Charley is a 1973 American blaxploitation Western film directed by Larry Spangler and starring Fred Williamson. It is the sequel to 1972's The Legend of Nigger Charley. It is followed by Boss Nigger. It is rated R in the United States.

Plot
The Soul of Nigger Charley continues the story of escaped slave Charley (Fred Williamson) and fellow ex-slave Toby (D'Urville Martin). This time, the two friends help a group of ex-slaves earn freedom as they combat a ruthless
ex-Civil War officer who wants to keep slavery alive by selling blacks to Southern plantation owners in Mexico.

Cast
 Fred Williamson as Charley
 D'Urville Martin as Toby
 Denise Nicholas as Elena
 Pedro Armendáriz Jr. as Sandoval (as Pedro Armendariz Jr.)
 Kirk Calloway as Marcellus
 George Allen as Ode
 Kevin Hagen as Colonel Blanchard
 Michael Cameron as Sergeant Foss
 Johnny Greenwood as Roy
 James Garbo as Collins
 Nai Bonet as Anita
 Bob Minor as Fred
 Fred Lerner as Woods
 Joe Henderson as Lee
 Richard Farnsworth as Walker (as Dick Farnsworth)

References

External links 

1973 films
Blaxploitation films
Paramount Pictures films
1973 Western (genre) films
Films about American slavery
American Western (genre) films
Films scored by Don Costa
1970s English-language films
1970s American films